The Colombian Open 2014 is the men's edition of the 2014 Colombian Open, which is a tournament of the PSA World Tour event International (Prize money : 50 000 $). The event took place in Bogota in Colombia from 6 to 9 August. Miguel Ángel Rodríguez won his third Colombian Open trophy, beating Omar Mosaad in the final.

Prize money and ranking points
For 2014, the prize purse was $50,000. The prize money and points breakdown is as follows:

Seeds

Draw and results

See also
PSA World Tour 2014
Colombian Open

References

External links
PSA Colombian Open 2014 website
Abierto Colombiano De Squash 2014 official website

Colombian Open (squash)
Colombian Open
2014 in Colombian sport